Three ships of the Royal Navy have borne the name HMS Insolent:

, a  wooden steam gunboat launched on 26 January 1856 and sold 1 May 1869.
, a 265-ton iron steam flatiron gunboat launched on 15 March 1881 and reduced to harbor service as a gate vessel in Portsmouth Harbour in January 1918; foundered on 1 July 1922.

Citations

References

Royal Navy ship names